Arthur Loftus Tottenham (5 April 1838 – 4 December 1887) was a landowner and Conservative politician who sat in the House of Commons from 1880 to 1887.

Biography
Tottenham was the eldest son of Nicholas Loftus Tottenham of Glenfarne Hall, [Glenfarne, Co Leitrim], and his wife Anna Maria Hopkins, daughter of Sir Francis Hopkins. He was educated at Eton and was a captain in the Rifle Brigade. He became J. P. for the counties of Leitrim, Cavan, and Fermanagh, and a Deputy Lieutenant for Co. Leitrim. He became High Sheriff of Leitrim in 1866.

In 1876 Tottenham stood for parliament unsuccessfully at Leitrim but was elected Member of Parliament for Leitrim in 1880. He held the seat until the Redistribution of Seats Act 1885 when he was elected MP for Winchester. He held the seat until his death at the age of 49. He was buried at St Andrew's Church, Hove.

Tottenham married Sarah Ann Gore in 1859. Major Arthur Gore Loftus Tottenham (1874–1940) and Herbert Ponsonby Loftus Tottenham (1871–1956) were among their children.

References

External links
 

1838 births
1887 deaths
People educated at Eton College
Irish Conservative Party MPs
Conservative Party (UK) MPs for English constituencies
UK MPs 1880–1885
UK MPs 1885–1886
UK MPs 1886–1892
Members of the Parliament of the United Kingdom for County Leitrim constituencies (1801–1922)
People from Enniskillen
Deputy Lieutenants of Leitrim
Politicians from County Leitrim
High Sheriffs of Leitrim